Wings over Pittsburgh is an American Air show which takes place at Pittsburgh International Airport in Pittsburgh, Pennsylvania.

Inaugurated in June 2000 the air show is one of the largest on the East Coast. Over the years the show has seen many unique displays from aircraft from all over the world. Some notable static displays include: Boeing P-8 Poseidon, Boeing C-17, Boeing KC-46 Pegasus, Boeing MV-22B Osprey, Boeing C-40 Clipper, Gulfstream C-37, Gulfstream C-20, Lockheed C-130T, Lockheed Martin KC-130, Beechcraft T-6 Texan and Beechcraft T-44A. Also, the 60th College Training Detachment (Army Air Forces Training Command) provided military training at the airfield.

In recent years the air show has featured displays by the Blue Angels and the USAF Thunderbirds. In 2016 and 2017 the United States Air Force, Navy and Army were joined by aircraft and aviators from the Royal Air Force, Canadian and French Air Forces. In upcoming years it was announced of the possibility of commercial airliners being on display. The types of aircraft or possible airlines featured have not been released and the organizers will not say more on the subject.

Over the almost 20 years of the event an estimated 1.5 million people have attended the air show the most being in 2005 with over 200,000 spectators.

Gallery
Images from the 2017 Air Show:

See also
 List of Air shows
 Northeastern Pennsylvania Air Show
 Aviation in Pennsylvania

References

Air shows
Aviation in Pennsylvania
Events in Pittsburgh